Jurrat is a 1989 Indian action film directed by David Dhawan, starring Shatrughan Sinha and Kumar Gaurav with Amrish Puri. Jurrat is a remake of the 1987 Hollywood movie The Untouchables.

Plot
With the help of Inspector Ram Singh, Inspector Avinash takes on notorious smuggler, Kama Seth.

Cast

Shatrughan Sinha as Inspector Ram Singh
Kumar Gaurav as Inspector Avinash
Anita Raj as Julie
Amala as Renu
Ranjeeta as Savitri Singh
Aruna Irani as Fatima
Tinu Anand as Anwar
Kiran Kumar as Raja
Amrish Puri as Kama
Bharat Kapoor as Kama's Lawyer
Raj Kiran as Joseph
Shammi as Joseph's Mother
Akash Khurana as Police Commissioner
Roopesh Kumar as Girdhar
Yunus Parvez as Abdullah Roti
Sudhir Pandey as Inspector Pandey
Om Shivpuri as Judge

Soundtrack
Lyrics: Anand Bakshi

References

External links

 Cult of Kumar

1989 films
1990s Hindi-language films
Films directed by David Dhawan
Indian action films
Films scored by R. D. Burman
1980s Hindi-language films
Films shot in Daman and Diu